David Cutler (born 1 August 1954) is a former English international lawn and indoor bowler.

Bowls career
Cutler won his first English triples title in 1972 aged 18 and at the time he was the youngest ever national champion. He represented St Austell BC and was both an England international indoors and outdoors representative.

He was part of the fours team with John Bell, Andy Thomson and Brett Morley that won the gold medal at the 1996 World Outdoor Bowls Championship in Adelaide. He also represented England, at the 1998 Commonwealth Games in Kuala Lumpur, Malaysia.

Personal life
He was an Inland revenue officer by trade.

References

English male bowls players
Living people
1954 births
Bowls World Champions
Bowls players at the 1998 Commonwealth Games
Commonwealth Games competitors for England